The Cape Cod Islanders were a Tier III junior ice hockey team from Massachusetts. They were most recently a member of the North American 3 Hockey League and played at the Falmouth Ice Arena in Falmouth, Massachusetts. In 2019, they announced they were relocating to Canton, Massachusetts, as the Canton Cubs, but were removed from the league schedule at the beginning of the season.

History

The team traces its roots back to the minor professional team, Cape Cod Cubs, that played in the region during the 1970s. The current team was founded as the Cape Cod Cubs in 2008 and joined the International Junior Hockey League for the 2009–2010 season. The Cubs won back to back IJHL Super Elite League titles in their first two seasons in the league. In 2011 the Cubs became the Cape Cod Islanders.

For the 2012–13 season the Cape Cod Islanders were a founding member of the Northern States Hockey League (NSHL). The Northern States Hockey League became the second hockey league sanctioned under the Amateur Athletic Union (AAU). The league left the AAU in 2014 and became the North American 3 Eastern Hockey League (NA3EHL), managed by the Tier II North American Hockey League, while seeking USA Hockey sanctioning, which they were given in 2015. Prior to the 2016–17 season, the Islanders became part of the North American 3 Hockey League (NA3HL) when it absorbed the NA3EHL.

In 2019, the Islanders relocated to Canton, Massachusetts, as the Canton Cubs and hired Geoff Walker as the head coach and general manager. However, Walker then took the job with the Western States Hockey League's Bellingham Blazers and the Cubs named Johnny McInnis as the head coach. The team was removed from the NA3HL before playing in Canton.

Season-by-season records

References

External links
 Official website
 Old website

Ice hockey teams in Massachusetts
Sports in Barnstable County, Massachusetts
2008 establishments in Massachusetts
Ice hockey clubs established in 2008
Falmouth, Massachusetts